Walter Sydney Sichel (1855–1933) was an English biographer and lawyer, the brother of Edith Helen Sichel, of German-Jewish descent, born in London and educated at Harrow and at Balliol College, Oxford.

He studied law and was called to the bar in 1879.  He wrote two law books and made contributions to the reviews.  Additionally, he wrote:

 The Squires [by Aston Ryot (Σ)], an Aristophanic Burlesque (1885)  
 Bolingbroke (1902)  
 Disraeli, A Study in Personality and Ideas (1904)  
 The Life of Lord Beaconsfield (1904)  
 Emma, Lady Hamilton (new edition, 1905)  
 The Life of Richard Brinsley Sheridan (two volumes, 1909)  
 Sterne, A Study (1910)

References

English Jewish writers
English biographers
19th-century English historians
1855 births
1933 deaths
People educated at Harrow School
Alumni of Balliol College, Oxford
English people of German-Jewish descent
19th-century English lawyers
20th-century English historians
Male biographers
20th-century English lawyers
19th-century biographers
20th-century biographers